George M. Foster may refer to:

 Pops Foster (George Murphy Foster, 1892–1969), jazz musician
 George M. Foster (anthropologist) (1913–2006), anthropologist at the University of California, Berkeley

See also
 George Foster (disambiguation)